Sosnovsky District is an administrative and municipal district (raion), one of the twenty-three in Tambov Oblast, Russia. It is located in the north of the oblast. The district borders with Morshansky District in the north, Pichayevsky District in the east, Tambovsky District in the south, and with Staroyuryevsky District in the west. Its administrative center is the urban locality (a work settlement) of Sosnovka. Population: 31,641 (2010 Census);  The population of Sosnovka accounts for 29.0% of the district's total population.

Notable residents 

Oleg Pashinin (born 1974), Uzbekistani football player and coach, born in Degtyanka
Aleksey Polosin (1924–1943), Red Army sergeant, Hero of the Soviet Union, born in the village of Kazinka

References

Sources

Districts of Tambov Oblast